Dicentria argyroma is a moth of the family Notodontidae. It is found in north-eastern Ecuador.

The length of the forewings is 18.5–21 mm. The ground colour of the forewings is a mixture of silvery white and purplish grey scales, with blackish brown scales scattered along the veins. The ground colour of the hindwings is coppery white.

Etymology
The species name is derived from Greek argyros (meaning silver) and omos (meaning shoulder) and refers to the silvery-white region of the forewings in the area of the discal cell.

References

Moths described in 2011
Notodontidae